"Calling Time" is a song by Swedish musician Basshunter, which appears on his five studio album about this same title. The single was released on 27 September 2013.

Background and release
Basshunter performed "Calling Time" in June 2011. In 2012 the video promoting the album about this same title, Basshunter in Magaluf !! – Featuring – Dream on the Dance Floor include "Calling Time" has been released. In March 2013, Basshunter uploaded demo of the "Calling Time". Song has been released on Calling Time on 13 May. On 24 June the release of single has been confirmed. The video promoting album, Basshunter – Calling Time // Album Snippet Mix released on 30 July included fragment of song. The single has been released on 27 September, as sixth single from album.

Track listing
 Digital download (27 September 2013)
 "Calling Time" (Album Edit) – 3:03
 "Calling Time" (Extended Mix) – 4:03
 "Calling Time" (Dawson & Creek Remix) – 5:04
 "Calling Time" (Josh Williams Mix) – 6:30
 "Calling Time" (Nitra M Remix) – 4:38

Release history

Music video 
Music video has been confirmed on 24 June 2013. On 7 July 2013, the music video was shot at Project X Boat Party.

Music video was directed by Gareth Evans and uploaded by Basshunter on 6 August.

References

External links
 

Basshunter songs
2013 singles
Songs written by Basshunter
Songs written by Scott Simons
2013 songs
Warner Music Group singles
Song recordings produced by Basshunter